Franco Causio (born 1 February 1949) is an Italian former professional footballer who won the 1982 FIFA World Cup and played for Juventus for many years in the 1960s, 1970s and 1980s. Regarded as one of Italy's greatest ever wingers, throughout his career, he was given the nickname "The Baron", because of his stylish moves on the pitch, as well as his well-educated upbringing, and his fair attitude in life.

Biography
Causio was born in Lecce, Apulia, and moved to Juventus when he was 17.

Club career

After some years on loan in Serie B (playing in Reggina and Palermo), he returned to Juventus in during 1970. For 11 years he wore the number 7 jersey for Juventus, and played alongside notable players such as Roberto Bettega, Roberto Boninsegna, Pietro Anastasi, Claudio Gentile, Marco Tardelli, Dino Zoff, Gaetano Scirea and Antonio Cabrini. During a highly successful period with the club, he won the scudetto six times, as well as winning a Coppa Italia, and an UEFA Cup. He also reached the European Cup final with Juventus during the 1972–73 season, as well as the Intercontinental Cup final that same year, narrowly missing out on a treble with the club, following their defeat in the Coppa Italia final that season, despite their Serie A title. His best finish in the European Cup Winners' Cup was during the 1979–80 season, when Juventus reached the semi-finals of the tournament.

Immediately after winning the Scudetto for the sixth time in his final season with Juventus, he moved to Udinese in 1981, where he played for three years, teaming up with Brazil national team star player Zico. Following his time at Udinese he played for Inter, and then joined his local town's football team, Lecce, in its debut in Serie A (1985–86). He finished his career playing for Serie B team Triestina at the age of 39.

International career
Causio made his debut with the Italy national team on 29 April 1972 in a 0–0 draw against Belgium, in a UEFA Euro 1972 qualifying match. He was in the Italian squad at the 1974 World Cup, and at the 1978 World Cup, where the Italians finished in fourth place after reaching the semi-final. He also represented Italy at the 1980 UEFA European Football Championship on home soil, where they once again finished in fourth place after a semi-final finish. He was most notably a member of the Italy squad that won the 1982 World Cup. With two red cards throughout his international career, he is Italy's most red carded player ever, alongside Giancarlo Antognoni and Daniele De Rossi.

Style of play
Regarded as one of the top Italian players of his generation, and one of the best ever Italian players in his position, Causio was usually deployed as a wide midfielder on the right flank, although he was also capable of playing in several other midfield positions, and was also often used as an offensive playmaker, or as a left winger. A creative, nimble, diminutive, and elegant footballer, he was gifted with excellent dribbling skills, and was an accurate crosser of the ball. In addition to his outstanding ball control and technical ability, he was also a fast and hard-working player, who possessed notable stamina, which enabled him to cover the flank effectively, and aid his team defensively as well as offensively.

Honours
Juventus
 Serie A (6): 1971–72, 1972–73, 1974–75, 1976–77, 1977–78, 1980–81
 Coppa Italia: 1978–79
 UEFA Cup: 1976–77

Italy
World Cup of Masters: 1993
FIFA World Cup: 1982

Individual
Guerin d'Oro: 1982

References

1949 births
Living people
Sportspeople from Lecce
Italian footballers
Association football wingers
Italy international footballers
Juventus F.C. players
Reggina 1914 players
Palermo F.C. players
Udinese Calcio players
Inter Milan players
U.S. Triestina Calcio 1918 players
A.S. Sambenedettese players
U.S. Lecce players
Serie A players
Serie B players
Serie C players
FIFA World Cup-winning players
1974 FIFA World Cup players
1978 FIFA World Cup players
UEFA Euro 1980 players
1982 FIFA World Cup players
UEFA Cup winning players
Italian beach soccer players
Footballers from Apulia